Tales of a Long Journey is a 1963 Hungarian drama film directed by Tamás Rényi. It was entered into the 3rd Moscow International Film Festival where it won a Silver Prize.

Cast
 Imre Sinkovits as Karló
 Ádám Szirtes as Doktor
 Ildikó Pécsi as Ica
 László Bánhidi as Zsiga (as Bánhidy László)
 József Madaras as Gugis
 István Sztankay as Lakatos
 Attila Lõte as Bónus Miklós
 József Kautzky as Monostori
 Gábor Koncz as Kulacs
 Dezsö Garas as Gál fõmérnök
 László György as Pribó

References

External links
 

1963 films
1963 drama films
1960s Hungarian-language films
Hungarian black-and-white films
Hungarian drama films